Blessed Are... is the twelfth studio album (and fourteenth overall) by Joan Baez, and her last with Vanguard Records, released in July 1971. It included her hit cover of The Band's "The Night They Drove Old Dixie Down", and songs by Kris Kristofferson, the Beatles, Jesse Winchester and The Rolling Stones, as well as a significant number of Baez' own compositions.  Like its immediate predecessors, the album was recorded in Nashville, and had a decidedly country feel.

The original vinyl version was released as a double album, which also included a bonus 7" 33 rpm record which included the songs "Maria Dolores" and Woody Guthrie's "Deportee", which she dedicated to the farmers of the world, adding, "May they soon cease to be victims." On CD pressings, these two tracks are on a separate disc, as the Red Book standards prohibit fitting them on a single, 80-minute disc.

It would be Baez' final studio album for Vanguard, her label of the previous eleven years, as she was to sign with A&M in early 1972.

Track listing
All tracks composed by Joan Baez; except where indicated

Side 1 

 "Blessed Are..." – 3:03
 "The Night They Drove Old Dixie Down" (Robbie Robertson) – 3:26
 "Salt of the Earth" (Mick Jagger, Keith Richards) – 3:22
 "Three Horses" – 7:03
 "The Brand New Tennessee Waltz" (Jesse Winchester) – 3:07

Side 2 

 "Last, Lonely and Wretched" – 3:42
 "Lincoln Freed Me Today (The Slave)" (David Patton) – 3:21
 "Outside the Nashville City Limits" – 3:20
 "San Francisco Mabel Joy" (Mickey Newbury) – 4:23
 "When Time Is Stolen" – 2:58

Side 3 

 "Heaven Help Us All" (Ronald Miller) – 3:32
 "Angeline" (Mickey Newbury) – 3:37
 "Help Me Make It Through the Night" (Kris Kristofferson) – 2:58
 "Let It Be" (John Lennon, Paul McCartney) – 3:48
 "Put Your Hand in the Hand" (Gene MacLellan) – 3:20

Side 4 

 "Gabriel and Me" – 3:27
 "Milanese Waltz/Marie Flore" – 5:55
 "The Hitchhikers' Song" – 4:19
 "The 33rd of August" (Mickey Newbury) – 3:42
 "Fifteen Months" – 4:30

Bonus 7" 

 "Maria Dolores" (Fernando García Morcillo, Jacobo Morcillo) (track on bonus 7") – 3:25
 "Deportee (Plane Wreck at Los Gatos)" (Woody Guthrie, Martin Hoffman) (track on bonus 7") – 5:15
 "Warm and Tender Love" (2005 bonus track) – 4:06

Personnel 
 Joan Baez – guitar, vocals
 Norman Blake – dobro, guitar
 David Briggs – keyboards
 Kenneth A. Buttrey – drums
 Charlie McCoy – harmonica 	
 Norbert Putnam – bass, arranger, producer
 Buddy Spicher – violin
 Pete Wade - guitar
 Ed Logan – tenor saxophone
 The Holladays - singers
Technical
 Gene Eichelberger – engineer
 Dave Harris – artwork	
 Jobriath – design
 Jack Lothrop – producer
 Jim Marshall – photography

Chart positions

Certifications

References

1971 albums
Joan Baez albums
Albums produced by Maynard Solomon
Albums produced by Norbert Putnam
Vanguard Records albums